The 2019 Honda Indy 200 at Mid-Ohio was an IndyCar Series event held at Mid-Ohio Sports Car Course in Lexington, Ohio. The race served as the 13th round of the 2019 IndyCar Series season. This marked the 35th time that Indy car racing had raced at Mid-Ohio. The event was supported by races from the three Road to Indy ladder series as well as Stadium Super Trucks and the Global MX-5 Cup. Will Power secured his fourth pole at Mid-Ohio, a record for the track. It was also his 57th overall pole in the IndyCar Series. Scott Dixon beat fellow Chip Ganassi Racing teammate Felix Rosenqvist by a margin of .0934, the closest margin of victory at Mid-Ohio. Points leader Josef Newgarden had a last lap spin which dropped him ten positions from a potential fourth place finish

Background

Entrants 
DragonSpeed was originally planning on entering Ben Hanley but pulled out due to visa issues.

Practice

Practice 1 
Practice 1 took place at 11:20 AM ET on July 26, 2019.

Practice 2 
Practice 2 took place at 3:15 PM ET on July 26, 2019.

Practice 3 
Practice 3 took place at 10:30 AM ET on July 27, 2019.

Qualifying 
Qualifying took place at 2:35 PM ET on July 27, 2019.

Qualifying classification 

 Notes
 Bold text indicates fastest time set in session.

Warm Up

Final Practice 
A Warm Up practice took place at 12:00 PM ET on July 28, 2019.

Race  

The race started at 4:00 PM ET on July 28, 2019.

Race classification

Championship standings after the race

Drivers' Championship standings

 Note: Only the top five positions are included.

References

Honda Indy 200
Honda Indy 200
Honda Indy 200
Indy 200 at Mid-Ohio